Otto Gunnar Elias Erdtman (18 November 1897 – 18 February 1973) was a Swedish botanist and pioneer in palynology. With the publication of his 1921 thesis in German, pollen analysis became known outside Scandinavia. Erdtman systematically studied pollen morphology and developed the method of acetolysis in pollen studies. His handbook An introduction to pollen analysis  was instrumental in the development of the discipline. In 1948, he created the palynological laboratory at the Swedish Museum of Natural History in Stockholm. He headed the laboratory until 1971, from 1954 with the title of professor.

References 

20th-century Swedish botanists
Palynologists
1897 births
1973 deaths